Meghan Toohey (born January 12, 1992) is an American soccer midfielder who played for Kvarnsvedens IK.

External links 
 

1992 births
Living people
American women's soccer players
Damallsvenskan players
American expatriate sportspeople in Sweden
Expatriate women's footballers in Sweden
Women's association football midfielders
Michigan Wolverines women's soccer players
Kvarnsvedens IK players